Columbus Crew 2 is a professional soccer team based in Columbus, Ohio that competes in the MLS Next Pro league, the third division of American soccer. The team is owned by, and operates as the reserve team of the Major League Soccer club Columbus Crew. The team plays home matches at Historic Crew Stadium. The team was announced as a member of MLS Next Pro on December 6, 2021.

History 
On December 6, 2021, the Columbus Crew announced the formation of a reserve team in MLS Next Pro that would begin play in the 2022 season and that they would play at Historic Crew Stadium in Columbus, Ohio. At the same time, the club announced its first manager, Corey Wrey, who is the Crew's current Assistant General Manager, a position he will continue to hold. The Crew 2 will be one of 21 teams that play in the newly formed league. On January 28, 2022, the Crew announced that Laurent Courtois would serve as the team's first head coach.

The club played their first match on March 26, 2022, which ended in a 0–2 loss to Inter Miami CF II at DRV PNK Stadium. The first win came the following week with a 1–0 victory over Chicago Fire FC II.

Crew 2 won the first ever MLS Next Pro Cup title, defeating St. Louis City SC 2 4-1 on October 8, 2022.

Players and staff

Current roster

Staff 

{|class="wikitable"
|-
!style="background:#FEDD00; color:#000; border:2px solid #000;" scope="col" colspan="2"|Front office
|-

|-
!style="background:#FEDD00; color:#000; border:2px solid #000;" scope="col" colspan="2"|Coaching staff
|-

|- 
!style="background:#FEDD00; color:#000; border:2px solid #000;" scope="col" colspan="2"|Additional staff
|-

Team records

Season-by-season

Head coaches record

Honors 
 MLS Next Pro Cup
 Champions: 2022
 MLS Next Pro Regular Season
 Champions: 2022
 MLS Next Pro Eastern Conference
 Champions (regular season): 2022
 Champions (playoffs): 2022
 Eastern Conference Central Division
 Champions:''' 2022

Monthly Awards

Player of the Month 

 May 2022: Jacen Russell-Rowe
 June 2022: Jacen Russell-Rowe

Goalkeeper of the Month 

 August 2022: Patrick Schulte

Annual Awards

MLS Next Pro Most Valuable Player 
 2022: Jacen Russell-Rowe

Golden Boot 

 2022: Jacen Russell-Rowe

Goalkeeper of the Year 

 2022: Patrick Schulte

Coach of the Year 

 2022: Laurent Courtois

MLS Next Pro Cup MVP 

 2022: Marco Micaletto

See also 
 Columbus Crew
 MLS Next Pro

References

External links 
 

Association football clubs established in 2021
2021 establishments in Ohio
Columbus Crew
Soccer clubs in Columbus, Ohio
Soccer clubs in Ohio
Reserve soccer teams in the United States
MLS Next Pro teams